The 2017 Angola Basketball Super Cup (24th edition) was contested by Primeiro de Agosto, as the 2016 league champion and Recreativo do Libolo, the 2016 cup winner. Recreativo do Libolo won its 3rd title.

The 2017 Women's Super Cup (22nd edition) was contested by Interclube, the 2016 women's league champion and Primeiro de Agosto, the 2016 cup runner-up. (Interclube won the cup as well). Interclube was the winner, making it is's 8th title.

2017 Men's Super Cup

2017 Women's Super Cup

See also
 2016 Angola Basketball Cup
 2016 BIC Basket
 2017 Victorino Cunha Cup

References

Angola Basketball Super Cup seasons
Super Cup